Ivor Gaber is a British academic and journalist, Professor of Political Journalism at University of Sussex, and Emeritus Professor of Broadcast Journalism at Goldsmiths, University of London. He serves as the UK Representative: on UNESCO’s International Programme for the Development of Communication.

Early life 
Born in High Wycombe, Buckinghamshire, he grew up in London and read for a BA in History and Politics at the University of Warwick before completing an MA in Labour Studies at the University of Sussex. He was awarded a PhD by City, University of London, in 2013 for his thesis " Crisis in Political Communications? Reflections of a Critical Practitioner".

Career

Journalism 

Gaber began his broadcasting career in 1978 at Independent Television News as a scriptwriter and item producer. He was a member of the ITN planning team that devised and launched Channel 4 News In 1982 he joined the Watchdog team at BBC TV as an investigate reporter and subsequently left to form Sevenday Productions and then Commons Committee Television where he led the bid that won the contract to televise the committees of the Lords and Commons and then the contract to televise both the main chambers. Susbequently he returned to the BBC where he planned and oversaw how the then new radio station, BBC 5 Live, would cover politics on a 24/7 basis. Between 1997 and 2019 he was the Results Editor for ITV News’ live general election results programme. As an independent radio producer he devised and produced a weekly 'person-in-the-news' programme for 5Live and a weekly programme about life in the UK for BBC World Service.

Academic career 
In 2015, Gaber became the University of Sussex's first Professor of Journalism. He is also Emeritus Professor of Broadcast Journalism at Goldsmiths, University of London, Visiting Professor of Media and Politics at the University of Bedfordshire and Senior Research fellow at City, University of London. He has published over 70 articles and chapters in the field of political communications and has authored or co-authored five books, with the most recent being: Culture Wars: the media and the British Left (new and revised edition) (with J. Curran and J. Petley) London, Routledge 2019.

International experience 
At UNESCO, representing the UK, Gaber initiated the UN Plan of Action on the Safety of Journalists and the Issue of Impunity. He has worked with political journalists in countries transitioning to democracy beginning in the former Communist countries of Eastern Europe and the Soviet Union. Recently he has focused mainly on sub-Saharan Africa including devising and running election reporting projects in Nigeria, Malawi and Uganda.

Books
 In the best interests of the child : culture, identity, and transracial adoption. London: Free Association Books. 1994. ISBN 978-1853431524.
 Culture Wars : the Media and the British Left (2nd ed.). Milton: Routledge. (2018). ISBN 1138223034.
 Environmentalism and the Mass Media: The North-South Divide. Routledge. (1997). ISBN 978-0-415-15504-5.

References 

Academics of the University of Sussex
Academics of Goldsmiths, University of London
Year of birth missing (living people)
Living people